Nagri is a town and nagar panchayat in the Dhamtari district of the Indian state of Chhattisgarh. It is located 64 kilometres from the district headquarters, Dhamtari. and 145 kilometres from state capital, Raipur. 

Mukundpur (3 kilometres away), Malhari (5 kilometres away), Sihawa (6 kilometres), Bhitarras (6 kilometres away) and Goregaon (6 kilometres away) are nearby villages to Nagri. Nagri is surrounded by Narharpur Tehsil to its west, Gariyaband Tehsil to its north, Baderajpur Tehsil to its south and Mainpur Tehsil to its east. 

Kanker, Dhamtari, Gobranawapara, Gariyaband and Umarkote are all nearby cities to Nagri.

Demographics
 India census, Nagri has a population of 13,308. Males constitute 50% of the population and females constitute 50%. Nagri has an average literacy rate of 67%, higher than the national average of 59.5%; its male literacy rate is 79%, and female literacy rate is 56%. As of 2011, 15% of Nagri's population is under 6 years of age. Nagri is covered by jungles and mountains and the Mahnadi river, the 'lifeline of Chhattisgarh', originates from Sihawa Hills, 8 kilometres from Nagri.

Education  
There are 9 schools and colleges; 6 schools and 3 colleges:
Sringee Rishi Higher Secondary School
 "Government Higher Secondary School"
Anand Marg School
Sarswati Shishu Mandir School
"Genius Public Higher Secondary School"
Mahanadi Academy

Government Sukhram Nage College Nagri (Chhipli)
Diet Nagri
Alshams Infotech Nagri

Tourist attractions
Various temples and natural sites attract tourists, such as:

River Mahanadi, the 'lifeline of Chhattisgarh', is sourced from Sihawa Hill, 8 kilometres away from Nagri.

Karneshwar Temple, made by the King Karnraj, is a popular attraction for tourists situated at Deopur, 5 kilometres away from Nagri.

Sringee Rishi Ashram, at the top of the Sihawa Hill, 8 kilometres away from Nagri.

Santa Devi Ashram is also situated at the top of Sihawa Hill.

Maa Sheetla Temple is situated at Bhitarras, 6.5 kilometres away from Nagri.

Mata Mahamai Temple is situated at Farsiyan, 9 kilometres away from Nagri.

Official language 
Chhattisgarhi and Hindi is the local language in Nagri.

References 

Cities and towns in Dhamtari district